Lee Chean Chung is a Malaysian politician who is currently serving as a Member of Parliament for Petaling Jaya constituency since November 2022. Prior to that, he had served as Member of the Pahang State Legislative Assembly (MLA) for Semambu from May 2013 until October 2022. He is a member of the People's Justice Party (PKR), a component party of the Pakatan Harapan (PH) coalition. Currently, he serves as the National Communication Director of PKR since 2022. Prior to this appointment, he had held several positions within PKR which include, Treasurer-General of PKR (2018 - 2022), National Information Chief of Youth Wing PKR (2014-2018) and Vice Youth Chief of Petaling Jaya Utara Division PKR (2008-2012). He also served as a Research Officer of the Opposition Leader's Office from 2008 to 2011.

Aside his involvement in PKR, he was appointed as Member of the Board of Director of Kuantan Port Authority in 2019.

Chean Chung was born and raised in Kuantan, State of Pahang, Malaysia and had attended Multimedia University (MMU) for his undergraduate pursuing Engineering (Majoring in Computer), and continued his post-graduate studies in Malaysia University of Science and Technology (MUST) and Lee Kuan Yew School of Public Policy, National University of Singapore (NUS) in 2019, pursuing Master of Science in Transportation and Logistics, as well as Master in Public Administration respectively. Chean Chung was also a Dong Fang Scholar from Peking University, China. 

Before active in politics, Chean Chung had worked in US & Hong Kong-based companies. He joined the Political Studies for Change Unit (KPRU) as a Research Officer after the 12th General Election (GE12). His unit provided strategic research support and organized bills' consultative meetings for nearly 30 Members of Parliaments of the party.

Chean Chung was active in environmental movements, and was appointed as the Media Chief for Stop Lynas Coalition (SLC) and the Publicity Chief for Himpunan Hijau 2.0 in 2011 during the movements against Lynas, the largest rare earth processing plant then in the world that was built next to Kuantan.

In the 15th General Election held on November 19, 2022, Chean Chung was elected as a Member of Parliament of  Petaling Jaya Constituency in Selangor, defeating five other candidates from various political parties (Perikatan Nasional, Pejuang, Barisan Nasional, Bebas, PRM) with 50,575 majority. Whereas in the 13th General Election held on May 5, 2013, Chean Chung was elected as the State Assemblyman of Semambu Constituency in Pahang, defeating a two-term incumbent from the ruling coalition with 3,200 majority. On May 9, 2018, again he retained the seat with a bigger majority of 5,511 votes. Active in the party, Chean Chung currently serves as the Vice Chairman of Pahang State Liaison Committee and also the Chairman of Indera Mahkota Division.

Chean Chung has research experience in several fields. His master thesis, titled “GPS Taxi Dispatch System Based on A* Shortest Path Algorithm”, has been cited in several journal articles. In 2019, he co-published a paper on "Institutions for Sustainability: Informal Settlers" in the GSP Conference 2019: Urban Possibilities: Reimagining Philippines. He co-authored books including "Jiwa Merdeka" and "Green Political Reform" (绿色政改), and is a contributor to The Edge, Malaysiakini and Oriental Daily.

Active in international engagement and training, Chean Chung was awarded the Most Outstanding Alumnus of Konrad Adenauer Stiftung Young Politicians (KASYP) program in 2019. He is also the fellow of International Adenauer Network, Professional Fellow of Youth for South East Asia Leadership Initiatives (YSEALI) and American Council of Young Political Leaders (ACYPL), and a graduate of the Political Advisor Course, Graduate School of Government (The University of Sydney). He was invited to speak at the Generation Democracy’s Youth Leadership Academy (2017), Copenhagen Democracy Summit (2020) as well as invitation by Danish Institute for Parties and Democracy (DIPD) (2020).

Political career

Positions in People's Justice Party (PKR) 

 Treasurer General of KEADILAN (2018 - 2022)
 Vice Chairman of KEADILAN Pahang Liaison Council (2019-current)
 Information Chief, Youth Wing KEADILAN (2015-2018)
 Chairman of KEADILAN Indera Mahkota division (2011-current)
 Chairman of Pakatan Harapan Indera Mahkota (2018-current)

Election results

References

1981 births
Living people
People from Pahang
Malaysian people of Chinese descent
People's Justice Party (Malaysia) politicians
Members of the Pahang State Legislative Assembly